Čeplinava (historically ) is a hamlet in Kėdainiai district municipality, in Kaunas County, in central Lithuania. It is located by the Nevėžis river, 6 km from Kėdainiai. According to the 2011 census, the hamlet has a population of 0 people.  

The hamlet was depopulated after 1979 (the last census data with population being detected).

Demography

References

Villages in Kaunas County
Kėdainiai District Municipality